Black Pearl is a live album by American jazz organist Jimmy McGriff featuring performances recorded in New Jersey in 1971 and released on the Blue Note label.

Track listing
All compositions by Jimmy McGriff except as indicated
 "Black Pearl" (Pierre Daniel, Sonny Lester)  
 "In a Mellow Tone" (Duke Ellington) 
 "Man from Bad"     
 "Ode to Billie Joe" (Bobby Gentry)  
 "Groove Alley"   
 "C Jam Blues" (Barney Bigard, Duke Ellington)  
Recorded live at The Golden Slipper in Newark, New Jersey in early 1971.

Personnel
Jimmy McGriff - organ
Ronald White - trumpet
Joseph Morris - alto saxophone
Arthur "Fats" Theus - tenor saxophone
William Thorpe - baritone saxophone
O'Donel "Butch" Levy - guitar 
Willie "Saint" Jenkins - drums

References

Blue Note Records live albums
Jimmy McGriff albums
1971 live albums
Albums produced by Sonny Lester